This is the list of cathedrals in Poland sorted by denomination.

Roman Catholic 

Cathedrals of the Roman Catholic Church in Poland:
 Cathedral Basilica of the Assumption of the Blessed Virgin Mary in Białystok
 Cathedral of St. Nicholas in Bielsko-Biała
 Co-Cathedral of the Nativity of the Blessed Virgin Mary in Żywiec
 Cathedral of St. Martin and St. Nicholas in Bydgoszcz
 Basilica of Our Lady of Licheń in Licheń
 Cathedral Basilica of the Holy Family in Częstochowa
 Cathedral of the Most Holy Trinity in Drohiczyn
 Co-Cathedral of the Immaculate Heart of Mary in Sokołów Podlaski
 Cathedral of St. Nicholas in Elbląg
 Co-Cathedral of St. John the Evangelist in Kwidzyn
 Co-Cathedral of St. Adalbert in Prabuty
 Cathedral of St. Adalbert in Ełk
 Co-Cathedral of Mary Mother of the Church in Gołdap
 Co-Cathedral of St. Alexander in Suwałki
 Cathedral Basilica of the Most Holy Trinity (Assumption) in Oliwa
 Co-Cathedral Basilica of the Assumption of the Blessed Virgin Mary in Gdańsk
 Cathedral of Sts. Peter and Paul in Gliwice
 Cathedral Basilica of the Assumption of the Blessed Virgin Mary and St. Adalbert in Gniezno
 Cathedral of St. Nicholas in Kalisz
 Co-Cathedral of St. Stanislaus in Ostrów Wielkopolski
 Cathedral of Christ the King in Katowice
 Cathedral Basilica of the Assumption of the Blessed Virgin Mary in Kielce
 Cathedral of the Immaculate Conception of the Blessed Virgin Mary in Koszalin
 Co-Cathedral Basilica of the Assumption of the Blessed Virgin Mary in Kołobrzeg
 Cathedral Basilica of St. Stanislaus and St. Wenceslaus in Kraków
 Cathedral of Sts. Peter and Paul in Legnica
 Cathedral Basilica of St. Stanislaus Kostka in Łódź
 Cathedral of St. Michael the Archangel in Łomża
 Cathedral Basilica of the Assumption of the Blessed Virgin Mary and St. Nicholas in Łowicz
 Cathedral of St. John the Baptist in Lublin
 Cathedral Basilica of the Holy Cross in Opole
 Cathedral of Queen of Poland in Warszawa
 Cathedral Basilica of the Assumption of the Blessed Virgin Mary in Pelplin
 Cathedral Basilica of the Blessed Virgin mary of Masovia in Płock
 Cathedral Basilica of Sts. Peter and Paul in Poznań
 Cathedral Basilica of the Assumption of the Blessed Virgin Mary and St. John the Baptist in Przemyśl
 Cathedral of St. John the Baptist in Przemyśl (Ukrainian Rite)
 Cathedral of the Protection of the Blessed Virgin Mary in Radom
 Cathedral of the Sacred Heart of Jesus in Rzeszów
 Cathedral Basilica of the Nativity of the Blessed Virgin Mary in Sandomierz
 Co-Cathedral Basilica of Mary Queen of Poland in Stalowa Wola
 Cathedral of the Immaculate Conception of the Blessed Virgin Mary in Siedlce
 Cathedral Basilica of the Assumption of the Blessed Virgin Mary in Sosnowiec
 Cathedral of St. Stanislaus and St. Wenceslaus in Świdnica
 Cathedral Basilica of St. James the Apostle in Szczecin
 Co-Cathedral of St. John the Baptist in Kamień Pomorski
 Cathedral Basilica of the Nativity of the Blessed Virgin Mary in Tarnów
 Cathedral Basilica of St. John the Baptist in Toruń
 Co-Cathedral Basilica of the Most Holy Trinity in Chełmża
 Cathedral Basilica of Our Lady of the Assumption and St. Andrew in Frombork
 Co-Cathedral Basilica of St. James in Olsztyn
 Cathedral Basilica of St. John the Baptist in Warszawa
 Cathedral Basilica of St. Michael the Archangel and St. Florian in Warszawa
 Co-Cathedral of Our Lady of Victory in Warszawa
 Cathedral of the Assumption of the Blessed Virgin Mary in Włocławek
 Cathedral Basilica of St. John the Baptist in Wrocław
 Cathedral of St. Vincent and St. James in Wrocław (Ukrainian Rite)
 Co-Cathedral of St. Bartholomew and St. Mary Protection in Gdańsk (Ukrainian Rite)
 Cathedral of the Resurrection and St. Thomas the Apostle in Zamość
 Co-Cathedral Shrine of St. Stanislaus in Lubaczów
 Cathedral of the Assumption of the Blessed Virgin Mary in Gorzów Wielkopolski
 Co-Cathedral of St. Hedwig in Zielona Góra

Eastern Orthodox

Cathedrals of the Polish Orthodox Church:

 Cathedral of St. Nicholas in Białystok
 Cathedral of St. Alexander Nevsky in Łódź
 Cathedral of the Transfiguration in Lublin
 Cathedral of the Holy Trinity in Sanok
 Cathedral of St. Mary Magdalene in Warsaw
 Provisional Field Cathedral of St. Nicholas the Wonderworker in Warsaw
 Cathedral of the Nativity of the Blessed Virgin Mary in Wrocław

See also
Lists of cathedrals
Christianity in Poland

References

Cathedrals in Poland
Poland
Cathedrals
Cathedrals